The acetabular notch is a deep notch in the acetabulum of the hip bone. The acetabular notch is continuous with a circular non-articular depression, the acetabular fossa, at the bottom of the cavity: this depression is perforated by numerous apertures, and lodges a mass of fat.

The notch is converted into a foramen by the transverse acetabular ligament; through the foramen nutrient vessels and nerves enter the joint; the margins of the notch serve for the attachment of the ligament of the head of the femur.

References

Bones of the pelvis